Forced adoption is the practice of forcefully taking children from their parents and placing them for adoption.  It may refer to:
 Forced adoption in Australia
 Forced adoption in the United Kingdom
 Sixties Scoop
 Child abductions in the 2022 Russian invasion of Ukraine
"forcibly transferring children of the group to another group" is part of the crime of genocide according to the Genocide Convention

Child custody
Adoption